Amos Urban Shirk ( 1890 – October 20, 1956) was an American businessman, author and reader of encyclopedias.

As a businessman he worked in the food industry. He wrote Marketing Through Food Brokers, published in 1939 by McGraw-Hill. He invented a synthetic chicle and introduced vitamin capsules to grocery stores.

He was also renowned as a prodigious reader. Shirk read the entire 23-volume 1911 Encyclopædia Britannica from cover to cover in four and a half years, reading on average three hours per evening, and taking two to six months per volume. As of 1934, he had begun reading the 14th edition, saying he found it a "big improvement" over the 11th, and saying that "most of the material had been completely rewritten".

Shirk did not limit himself to Britannica. He also read Henry Smith Williams's 24-volume Historians' History of the World, which took him two years, as well as an 18-volume set of works by Alexandre Dumas, a 32-volume set of Honoré de Balzac, and a 20-volume set of Charles Dickens.

Shirk had other hobbies including painting and record collecting.

See also
 The Know-It-All: One Man's Humble Quest to Become the Smartest Person in the World

References

External links
 

Encyclopædia Britannica
1890s births
1956 deaths
American book and manuscript collectors
American encyclopedists
American food industry businesspeople